Mittelholstein ("central Holstein") is an Amt ("collective municipality") in the district of Rendsburg-Eckernförde, in Schleswig-Holstein, Germany. It was formed on 1 January 2012 from the three former Ämter Aukrug, Hanerau-Hademarschen and Hohenwestedt-Land and the municipality Hohenwestedt. The seat of the Amt is in Hohenwestedt.

The Amt Mittelholstein consists of the following municipalities:

{|
||
Arpsdorf 
Aukrug
Beldorf
Bendorf 
Beringstedt 
Bornholt 
Ehndorf
Gokels 
Grauel 
Hanerau-Hademarschen
||
Heinkenborstel 
Hohenwestedt 
Jahrsdorf 
Lütjenwestedt 
Oldenbüttel 
Meezen 
Mörel 
Nienborstel 
Nindorf 
Osterstedt 
||
Padenstedt 
Rade bei Hohenwestedt 
Remmels 
Seefeld
Steenfeld 
Tackesdorf 
Tappendorf 
Thaden
Todenbüttel 
Wapelfeld
|}

Ämter in Schleswig-Holstein